Tridens is a genus of perennial grasses in the family Poaceae native to the Americas.

 Species

 Tridens albescens (Vasey) Wooton & Standl. - southwest + south-central USA (AZ NM TX LA AR OK KS), Mexico (Chihuahua, Durango, Coahuila, Tamaulipas, Nuevo León)
 Tridens ambiguus (Elliott) Schult. – pine barren fluffgrass - southeastern USA (TX LA MS AL GA FL SC NC)
 Tridens brasiliensis (Nees ex Steud.) Parodi - Brazil, Paraguay, Uruguay, Argentina
 Tridens buckleyanus (Vasey ex L.H.Dewey) Nash  - Texas
 Tridens carolinianus (Steud.) Henrard - southeastern USA (LA MS AL GA FL SC NC)
 Tridens congestus (L.H.Dewey) Nash – pink fluffgrass USA (AZ TX)
 Tridens eragrostoides (Vasey & Scribn.) Nash – lovegrass tridens - southern USA (TX AZ NM AL FL), Mexico, Cuba, Venezuela
 Tridens flaccidus (Döll) Parodi - Brazil, Guyana, Venezuela, Colombia
 Tridens flavus (L.) Hitchc. – purpletop - Ontario, eastern + central USA, Nuevo León
 Tridens hackelii (Arechav.) Parodi - Brazil, Uruguay, Argentina
 Tridens muticus (Torr.) Nash – slim tridens - southwestern + south-central USA (CA NV AZ UT CO NM TX OK KS MO AR LA), Mexico (Baja California, Sonora, Chihuahua, Durango, Coahuila, Zacatecas, Nuevo León, Querétaro, San Luis Potosí, Tamaulipas)
 Tridens nicorae Anton - northern Argentina
 Tridens × oklahomensis (Feath.) Feath.  - Oklahoma  (hybrid T. flavus × T. strictus)
 Tridens riograndensis Acedo & Llamas - Rio Grande do Sul in Brazil
 Tridens strictus (Nutt.) Nash – longspike tridens - southeastern + south-central USA (from TX to FL to IL + PA)
 Tridens texanus (S. Watson) Nash  - USA (TX NM), Mexico (Chihuahua, Durango, Coahuila, Nuevo León, Tamaulipas, San Luis Potosí)

 Formerly included

References

External links

 Jepson Manual: Tridens
 USDA Plants Profile

Chloridoideae
Grasses of North America
Grasses of South America
Grasses of Argentina
Grasses of Brazil
Grasses of Mexico
Grasses of the United States
Poaceae genera
Taxa named by Palisot de Beauvois